is a Japanese manga artist, illustrator and designer. She is particularly known for having drawn The Promised Neverland manga series.

She debuted as a manga artist with the 2013 CoroCoro Comic series Oreca Monsters Adventure Retsuden. A collection of illustrations, The Art of Posuka Demizu Pone and Postcard Planet, were released in 2016 and 2021 by PIE International.

Biography
Posuka Demizu was born on 17 January 1988, and lives in Tokyo, Japan. She emerged on the manga scene in 2008 with a mini-series for the monthly manga magazine CoroCoro Comic. She has worked on a wide range of projects with children’s magazines and video game companies. Notably, she has worked with the animation studio J.C.Staff on the series The Pet Girl of Sakurasou and illustrated a manga series titiled Oreca Monsters Adventure Retsuden on the CoroCoro Comic magazine based on the popular card game Oreca Battle. She has also published several works on the artists' website Pixiv.

Beginning in 2016, Demizu collaborated with author Kaiu Shirai on The Promised Neverland. The series began in Weekly Shōnen Jump'''s 35th issue on 1 August 2016, published by Shueisha, and ended in the magazine's 28th issue on 15 June 2020. It followed Emma and her siblings who try to escape the orphanage they grew up in after they find out the unsettling truth behind it. Originally, Shirai planned to write and draw, but his editor felt like Shirai’s style ‘didn’t do the script justice’ and that it would be too hard for Shirai to keep up the quality of both. As a result of this, Demizu joined the project. Shirai had seen Demizu’s art before and enjoyed it, but before starting the series they created a one-shot called Poppy's Wish. The outcome was better than Shirai originally imagined. On 3 September 2021, Kaiu Shirai x Posuka Demizu: Beyond The Promised Neverland was published in Japan, which included works in combination between the two artists.

A collaborative exhibition「MIROIRS – Manga meets CHANEL」 by Posuka Demizu, Kaiu Shirai and Chanel was held at Chanel Nexus Hall Ginza, Chūō, Tokyo, from 28 April to 4 June 2021. The manga Miroirs, written and illustrated by the duo, was inspired by the Chanel brand and was published by Shueisha on 30 April 2021. In this exhibition, scenes from “miroirs” are exhibited alongside precious works from Chanel.

In 2022, Posuka Demizu worked on the character design of the "tactical hero summoning RPG" mobile game titled unVEIL the world. The game will be released for iOS and Android and is produced by Shueisha Games and NetEase Games. In November 2022, it was announced that Posuka Demizu will handle the character design and the concept art of the Dragons of Wonderhatch series on Disney+.

Influences
Posuka Demizu commented that she was influenced by many illustrators and manga artists including, Yasushi Nirasawa, Naohisa Inoue, Yutaka Ohno, Takayuki Sakai; and Makoto Hijioka with Kotone Yumiya for manga artists. She also stated that her next titles will have gotten the most influence from Kaiu Shirai.

She also mentioned Final Fantasy series and Oreca Battle as a source of influences for her art and own signature style.

Works
Manga

One-shots

Light novels

Art books

Other works
 Character designer and concept artist for Dragons of Wonderhatch.
 Character designer for the smartphone game unVEIL the world.
 Illustrator for the Japanese poster of Dune.
 Cover illustration for the women's fashion magazine Spur.
 Participated in animation production of The Pet Girl of Sakurasou (design).
 Illustrator for the Pokémon, Wixoss, Duel Masters Trading Card Games.
 Illustrator for the manga version of Animal Kaiser Evolution, Great Animal Kaiser, and Strong Animal Kaiser Evolution''.
 (2022) - End card (episode 7).

Awards

References

External links
Official website 

Posuka Demizu on Pixiv

1988 births
Living people
Manga artists